The flag of the Republic of North Ossetia–Alania, a federal subject of Russia, is a tricolour, top to bottom white, red, and yellow. The flag is also said to represent the social structure of ancient Ossetian society, which was divided into three social groups forming an organic whole: the military aristocracy, the clergy, and ordinary people. The colours symbolise moral purity (white), martial courage (red) and wealth and prosperity (yellow). In blazons, the flag is described as Per fess Argent and Or, a fess Gules. The proportions are 1:2.

Under the Soviet Union, North Ossetia had a predominantly red flag with blue trim on the left edge, the hammer and sickle and the words "North Ossetian ASSR" in both Russian and Ossetian. Shortly before the collapse of the Soviet Union, it was replaced with the present flag, which was adopted on 2 October 1991.

Colour scheme

Historical Flags

See also 
 Coat of arms of North Ossetia–Alania
 Flag of South Ossetia

Notes

References

External links 

National flags
Flags introduced in 1990
Flag
Flags of the federal subjects of Russia
Ossetia